Apex Records was a Canadian record label owned by the Compo Company which lasted as late as 1980.

Compo established the Apex label in July 1921 in Toronto. It released American recordings from Okeh Records and Gennett Records, among others. It also released recordings by Canadian artists for both the Anglophone and Francophone communities.

After Compo began a distribution arrangement with Decca Records (USA) in 1935, the Apex name was dropped. Apex was revived in 1942 to market Canadian recordings. American Decca bought Compo in 1951. In 1952, Apex resumed issuing American recordings from the various independent American record companies which were established after World War II. Compo was renamed MCA Records (Canada) in 1970, retaining the Apex label for Francophone recordings for a few years before phasing out the label. MCA Canada formally abandoned the trademark in 1984.

Discography of 45 rpm singles (incomplete)

Listed in alphabetical order by artist's first name:

References

External links 
 Apex singles 76000 series
 Compo Company article in The Canadian Encyclopedia
 Compo entry in the History of Recorded Sound in Canada
 Compo entry from Collections Canada
 Entry at discogs.com

Defunct record labels of Canada
Record labels established in 1921
Record labels disestablished in 1935
Record labels established in 1942
Record labels disestablished in 1980
Re-established companies
Canadian companies established in 1921
Companies based in Toronto
1980 disestablishments in Canada